Stéphane Samson (born 3 September 1975) is a French former professional football who played as a striker.

External links

1975 births
Living people
Association football forwards
French footballers
Le Havre AC players
Le Mans FC players
Clermont Foot players
Stade Malherbe Caen players
Stade de Reims players
Ligue 1 players
Ligue 2 players